The 22nd congressional district of Ohio was eliminated as a result of the redistricting cycle after the 1980 Census.

In its last decade, the district primarily consisted of eastern Cuyahoga county, with minor parts of western Geauga, western Lake, and northern Summit counties.

List of members representing the district

Election results
The following chart shows historic election results. Bold type indicates victor. Italic type indicates incumbent.

 Possible error in records: Simon B. Fitzsimmons, the Democratic nominee in 1928, is likely the same person as Sam B. Fitzsimmons, the Democratic nominee in 1924. There is no indication of which is the correct name.

References

 Congressional Biographical Directory of the United States 1774–present

External links 
 1978 Maps of Ohio - Showing Congressional, Senatorial, Representatives, and Judicial Districts, Ted W. Brown, Secretary of State, and James Marsh, Assistant Secretary of State

22
Former congressional districts of the United States
Constituencies established in 1915
1915 establishments in Ohio
Constituencies disestablished in 1983
1983 disestablishments in Ohio